Brand Hong Kong (or BrandHK) was launched in 2001 as a government programme designed to promote Hong Kong as "Asia’s World City". The purpose of this concept is to create a reputation of Hong Kong as a top international city. This idea was formed after the transfer of sovereignty over Hong Kong in 1997, the event that made Hong Kong a special administrative region of China. The branding features Hong Kong as a place of "creativity, entrepreneurship, global connectivity, security and rich diversity".

In 2010, following a major review and public engagement exercise, BrandHK was updated, incorporating changes to its visual identity, core values, attributes and brand platform.

History
The idea of “branding” Hong Kong originated in 1997, when more attention was focused on the handover of Hong Kong to China. The handover led to concerns over Hong Kong's ability to remain as an international financial centre as well as a global city. The decision to develop BrandHK was finally taken by the Government of Hong Kong in 2000.

Extensive research and consultation was undertaken in Hong Kong and internationally, leading to the choice of “Asia’s World City” as the brand motto that best reflects the city's traits, while a stylised dragon was considered to best represent the Hong Kong's visual identity. The Government Review in 2008 was undertaken to identify changes that had taken place in and around the city since 2001, and to incorporate those changes into the brand.

Promotions 
The Government of Hong Kong has strongly promoted such branding, and has been well-known by Hong Kong people. Promotional items and banners have been seen on buses, ships, streets banners, etc.

First generation

Second generation

Visual design 
The original image design incorporated the Chinese characters of Hong Kong as well as the city's initial 'HK'.

In 2010, following a Government review, the dragon logo was updated, making the dragon head smaller and incorporating three streak of ribbons behind the dragon's head. It also brought a more colourful design, referring to Hong Kong's "diversity and dynamism". The blue and green ribbons symbolise the blue sky and sustainable environment of Hong Kong, while the red ribbon symbolises Lion Rock, indicating the "can-do" spirit of the Hong Kong people.

Criticism

Design 
Upon unveiling of the new-style "ribbon" logo in 2010, it was criticized that the fees paid to the branding company could not be justified by the limited updates to the logo. The article also included interview quotations from the designer of the previous brand image, who disliked the removal of the 'HK' and '香港' characters from the dragon 'flames', suggesting that the change reduced the meaning of the brand.

Branding 
Despite the promotion from the government to build such an image to the city, criticism has been raised throughout the years. Incidents such as racist acts to ethnics minorities from police, news about Hong Kong's low city competitiveness rankings and low liveability rankings, and the intense conflicts between Hong Kong people and the Chinese government has raised doubt to such branding to the city.

References

External links
 
 Official website

Culture of Hong Kong
Government of Hong Kong
Economy of Hong Kong
Tourism in Hong Kong